Lakeport is an unincorporated community in Chicot County, Arkansas.

Unincorporated communities in Chicot County, Arkansas
Unincorporated communities in Arkansas